Marc Menchaca (born October 10, 1975) is an American actor, writer and director. He was co-director, co-writer, and lead actor of the 2013 Heartland Film Festival Award Winning movie This Is Where We Live, and was awarded best actor at the Breckenridge Film Festival in 2016 for his lead role in the film Reparation. He has appeared in several television shows including Ozark in 2018, and The Sinner, Manifest, and The Outsider in 2019.

Early life
Menchaca first became interested in performing as a student at Central High School. After graduating, he attended Texas A&M University, earning a bachelor's degree in English; it was also where he acted in his first play. He attended a summer acting program at the Circle in the Square Theatre School in Manhattan before deciding to pursue an acting career in his twenties. He is an alumnus of the William Esper Studio.

Career
Menchaca was co-director, co-writer and lead actor of the 2013 Heartland Film Festival Award Winning movie This Is Where We Live, 

In 2015, he played a lead role as Bob Stevens, a veteran struggling with memory loss, in the Kyle Ham-directed film Reparation. It earned him the best actor award at the Breckenridge Film Festival, with the film receiving a further 10 festival awards, including the Austin Film Festival ‘s Audience Choice prize and Best Film at the Santa Fe Film Festival.

In the 2018 Netflix television series Ozark, Menchaca had a recurring role as Russ Langmore, a man struggling to suppress his homosexuality. He has regular recent roles on television in The Sinner and Manifest. He appeared again on TV with Jason Bateman in 2019, in the Stephen King horror miniseries The Outsider portraying Jack Hoskins for all 10 episodes.

In 2020, Menchaca won Best Actor in a Feature at the Mammoth Film Festival Awards  for his performance as Sam in the John Hyams thriller Alone alongside co-star Jules Willcox. He performed his own stunts in the film, including a fight scene in mud with Willcox. He received a further award for Best Actor in 2020 at the Oxford International Film Festival (OXIFF) in the UK, for his portrayal of 'The Man' in #Like  directed by Sarah Pirozek. 
In 2021, he starred in the Santiago Menghini directed Netflix horror movie No One Gets Out Alive with co-star Cristina Rodlo.

Personal life
On October 6, 2022, Menchaca married British actress Lena Headey in Puglia, Italy.

Filmography

Film

Television

Video games

Awards and nominations

References

External links
 
 Marc Menchaca – Twitter

1975 births
21st-century American male actors
American male film actors
American male television actors
American male voice actors
Circle in the Square Theatre School alumni
Living people
Male actors from Texas
People from San Angelo, Texas
William Esper Studio alumni